is a 2015 Japanese animated youth school musical film. The film is part of the Love Live! School Idol Project multimedia series by Sunrise, Lantis and Dengeki G's Magazine, taking place after the second season of the 2013-2014 anime television series. The film was directed by Takahiko Kyōgoku, written by Jukki Hanada, produced by Sunrise, and distributed by Shochiku. The film was released in Japan on June 13, 2015 and licensed in North America by NIS America.

Plot

The movie begins with a scene from the second years' childhood, where Honoka is trying to jump over a puddle left from the rain, with Kotori cheering her on and Umi watching from behind a tree. Despite failing multiple times and being asked by Kotori to give up and go home instead, she finally manages to soar over it in the end.

The story takes place after the events of the second season, where μ's (pronounced "muse") receives a notification that the organizers of Love Live! intend to hold a third competition, aiming to hold it within Tokyo Dome this time. But to achieve that dream, they require more publicity in order to have it become a sell-out concert. Therefore, to spread the appeal of school idols to even more people, they have decided to send μ's to the United States, where a TV agency has offered to do a cover on them. Even though μ's had already decided to disband, they agree to perform in order to help Love Live! gather more support, as they are still school idols until the end of the month.

While preparing for the live and doing their training in New York City, μ's continues to enjoy themselves as tourists as well, with the insert song  played at the end of the montage. During one of these times, however, Honoka gets separated from the rest of the group. Lost in a foreign land, she encounters a lone Japanese female singer performing on the streets, and is charmed by her beautiful voice singing "As Time Goes By" (Japanese) / "Stars, Come to Me!" (International). On the way back to the hotel, Honoka asks about her story, and realizes that they were the same. The singer also used to perform music with her close friends, and ended up alone in New York after many encounters and partings. Honoka was led back to her hotel safely by the singer, but when she turned to introduce her to the rest of μ's, the singer had already vanished. Honoka was left carrying the singer's microphone set, with one question lingering in her head from their conversation: "What's most important is, whose sake do you sing for?" The first section of the movie concludes with them performing "Angelic Angel" in New York's Times Square and Central Park.

After returning to Japan, μ's had become tremendously popular, with the whole of Akihabara covered in their advertisements and goods. Since the video from New York was broadcast across Japan, the girls are now stars, needing to sneak around wearing disguises, with the insert song  playing. But with all the fans telling them that they want μ's to continue forever, the girls' hearts begin to waver regarding their decision to disband. They realize that they have to answer to their fans, and they have only two choices. To surpass the barrier of being only school idols and become actual idols, or to hold onto their original determination and halt activities upon the third years' graduation. Principal Minami also calls them to her office, informing them that she too wishes them to continue even if they have to reinvent themselves as something other than school idols. While Honoka is fretting over the decision at night, Tsubasa calls her out on a late night ride with A-Rise, and tells her about the possibility of lengthening μ's career just like they themselves had, and introduce their management company to her.

Faced with the dilemma out in the middle of a rainstorm, Honoka hears a lone voice singing, and runs into the same singer she met before. Insisting that she needed to thank her, Honoka drags her back to her home, only to have her stop just outside, saying that that was good enough. The singer then asks if Honoka had found the answer to her question yet. After having Honoka close her eyes, the two of them are transported to a hill full of flowers, in front of a large lake. The singer then asks Honoka to jump over the lake, telling her that she definitely can fly whenever she wanted. Honoka proceeds to run down the hill and take the jump, reaffirming her love for the existence of school idols. Eli also sends Honoka a message on behalf of the third years after they had discussed it, telling her their decision to stop activities.

Honoka wakes up the next morning and heads back to the rooftop, where everyone has come to the same decision. There, Honoka announces her final idea, to hold a concert to promote all school idols as their final contribution to the industry. She goes over to UTX High School where she pitches the idea to Tsubasa, who accepts it readily. Despite having sent emails to all school idols across the country, not many of them are accepting of it, which leads Honoka to decide that they need to meet them personally in order for their feelings to get through. "Future Style" plays after this sequence.

Using Maki's money for train fare, they head out in groups of three across the nation to convince school idols to join their endeavor. The massive crowd gathers in Akiba at the end, and begins preparing for the school idol festival to occur. Kotori and Anju work together on the costumes, while Maki and Tsubasa work on the song. On the final evening before the event, Honoka announces to everyone the news of μ's disbandment, to everyone's dismay.

The day of the festival finally arrives, and all of μ's heads towards Akiba together. As Eli decides to start a race there and μ's begins running, Honoka is distracted by a single drifting petal, reminiscent of the flowers upon the hill in the illusionary world. She begins to run while doing pirouettes and spins along the way, feeling that just like before, she really can soar anytime she wanted now with the burden off her shoulders. When she gets to the site, all of μ's is greeted by the sight of all of the school idols already there, dressed in costumes following a style similar to their own design. The massive crowd parts to give them a clear path to the stage, and the festival begins with the performance of "Sunny Day Song", which is now the song for all school idols.

A new school year begins in Otonokizaka High School, with Yukiho and Alisa shown as third years carrying on μ's' will and discussing their plans for the Idol Research Club. The pair give the welcoming speech to the freshmen, talking about how the school was saved by μ's and talking about their finishing performance. The scene then transitions to a backstage flashback of μ's just before their last idol performance. The movie concludes with  being performed at the Tokyo Dome, signifying the beginning of μ's final performance.

Production
The film was announced in June 2014 at the end of the second season finale of the Love Live! School Idol Project anime television series, as part of the celebration of the fifth anniversary of the franchise.

Music
Three CD singles with insert songs from the film were released. It was number-two on the weekly Oricon Singles Chart, with 82,000 copies sold, having the highest ranking and best first week sales of a Love Live! single. It sold an estimated 131,274 copies in 2015, becoming the second best-selling anime CD single of the year in Japan.

It broke the franchise record for first week sales set by the previous single, with 86,000 copies; it was also number-two on the weekly Oricon Singles Chart. It sold an estimated 125,225 copies, becoming the third best-selling anime CD single of the year in Japan.

The third single, "Bokutachi wa Hitotsu no Hikari / Future Style", was released on July 15 and had  by μ's and "Future Style" by Honoka Kōsaka (Emi Nitta), Kotori Minami (Aya Uchida) and Umi Sonoda (Suzuko Mimori) It broke the franchise record for first week sales set by the second single, with 96,000 copies sold; it was also number-two on the weekly Oricon Singles Chart. It sold an estimated 124,254 copies, becoming the fourth best-selling anime CD single of the year in Japan.

Due to a licensing issue in the international version, "As Time Goes By" was replaced with an original song, "Stars, Come to Me!". Both songs were sung by the female singer (Minami Takayama).

Release
In January 2015 the release date for the film was announced as June 13, 2015. It was released on home video in Blu-ray on December 15, 2015. The Limited Special Edition sold 193,769 copies on its first week, becoming the weekly number-one animation Blu-ray in the country. By January 24, 2016, it had sold 220,772 copies. During the first TV broadcast by NHK Educational TV on January 3, 2017, the viewers celebrating with tweeting with their hashtag "#lovelive", and became the #1 trending topic in Japan.

The film was released theatrically in South Korea on September 3, 2015, in the United States on September 11, 2015 and in Indonesia on October 21. As of December 2015, the film had been shown in several other countries, including Australia, Brunei, Hong Kong,  Malaysia, New Zealand, the Philippines, Singapore, Taiwan, Thailand and Vietnam, and was also scheduled to be released in Canada at the start of 2016.

Reception

Box office
The film was number-one on its opening weekend in Japan, where it grossed  and had 251,811 admissions, from 121 theaters. In its second weekend, Love Live! was topped the box office in admissions (188,000) and theater average earning ($17,558), It grossed an estimated , marking a 34.5% decline. After topping the box office reign for three consecutive weekends, Love Live! The School Idol Movie was finally overtaken in its fourth weekend by Avengers: Age of Ultron from Marvel Studios and Walt Disney Studios Motion Pictures. It grossed  ($26,163,074) in total in Japan.

The film became the anime film with most admissions in South Korea, with 86,400 as of October 13, 2015. It went on to sell 133,362 tickets and gross  ($943,398) in South Korea. In the United States, the film grossed . In Taiwan, it grossed $241,490. In other Asia-Pacific territories, it grossed $236,901. Combined, the film grossed  worldwide.

Critical reception
Nick Creamer of Anime News Network said the film is "not a series high point, but it's a reasonable conclusion to the first Love Live! saga."

Awards and nominations
The film was second place for Best Picture at the Newtype Anime Awards 2015. It won an Award of Excellence by being nominated for Animation of the Year at the 39th Japan Academy Prize. It won the Theatrical Animation Division prize at the 2016 Tokyo Anime Award Festival.

References

External links

Japanese idols in anime and manga
Shochiku films
Sunrise (company)
2015 anime films
Animated films based on animated series
Films featuring an all-female cast
Films set in New York City
Music in anime and manga
School life in anime and manga
Love Live!
Foreign films set in the United States